"Mrs. Wiggins" (also known as "Mr. Tudball and Mrs. Wiggins") is a series of comedy sketches featured on The Carol Burnett Show, with one installment airing on Carol Burnett & Company. The Carol Burnett Show introduced the skit series during its ninth season in 1975–76 and continued to air new installments for the remainder of its 11-season run, through its final season in 1977–78. However, the final installment of "Mrs. Wiggins" would not air until August 18, 1979 on a different four-week summer series titled Carol Burnett & Company. This was the only installment of "Mrs. Wiggins" that did not air on The Carol Burnett Show which had completed its run almost a year and a half earlier on March 29, 1978. All together, there were 19 installments of "Mrs. Wiggins" sketches.

Premise
"Mrs. Wiggins" features two characters created by Tim Conway: Mr. Bernie Tudball (played by Conway) and Mrs. Wanda Wiggins (played by Carol Burnett). Vicki Lawrence would occasionally play Mr. Tudball's wife. Mr. Tudball is a businessman with an off-color toupee and a mock Romanian accent, pronouncing his secretary's name "Mrs. Uh-Whiggins". Mrs. Wiggins is his secretary, a "bimbo who the IQ fairy never visited". She was notably recognized by how she walked in her skirt, as designed by Bob Mackie, and her near-constant fingernail filing. The sketches center on Mr. Tudbull's frustration over Mrs. Wiggins' dimwittedness, such as not being able to properly use the office intercom system.

Background
Tim Conway created the sketch after The Carol Burnett Show writers' office secretary, Charlene, would constantly press the wrong button on the intercom.

Mrs. Wiggins was originally written to be a little old lady, but Bob Mackie decided to go another route. He decided to base the look of Mrs. Wiggins on the kind of secretary that would sit around and file her nails and go to lunch. In the costuming of Mrs. Wiggins, Mackie put Burnett in a very tight skirt that would control the way she walked. He told Burnett to stick her behind in the bagging part in the back of the skirt, and this gave her the "Wiggins walk."

Sketches

References

Wiggins
Comedy sketches
Wiggins
Wiggins
Wiggins
Carol Burnett